The Living Coast Discovery Center is an environmental education center with marine animal, animal and bird exhibits located in the Sweetwater Marsh Unit of the San Diego National Wildlife Refuge in Chula Vista, California. Permanent displays at the Living Coast focus on native animals and plants found in Southern California and San Diego Bay.

Exhibits

The site consists of several large exhibit spaces:

 Turtle Lagoon - Eastern Pacific green sea turtles
 Discovery Center Galleria - includes seahorses, jellyfish, eels, sharks, lobsters, crabs, octopus, garibaldi damselfish, sea stars, snakes, lizards
 Shark & Ray Experience & Sting Ray Touch pool - Leopard sharks, grey smooth-hound sharks, horn sharks, swell shark, shovelnose guitarfish, bat rays, round rays, diamond rays, crabs, fish, and loggerhead sea turtle
 Burrowing Owl Courtyard
 Shorebird Aviary - light-footed clapper rail, snowy egret, black-crowned night heron, Black oystercatcher, red-breasted merganser, hooded merganser, and more
 Raptor Row - red-tailed hawk, red-shouldered hawk, Cooper’s hawk, osprey, peregrine falcon, turkey vulture, barn owl, great horned owl, burrowing owl, American kestrel
 Eagle Mesa - golden eagle, bald eagle
 Native plant gardens and composting demonstration garden

The Living Coast runs a new seasonal exhibit each year, featuring animals from around the world, from late March–early April through Labor Day.

There are 1.5 miles of trails from the Center in the San Diego National Wildlife Refuge out to the shore of San Diego Bay.

In addition to general public exhibits, the Living Coast hosts over 15,000 school children at their facility each year for educational field trips that focus on Science and Environmental programs.

History
The Center was originally opened in 1987 as the Chula Vista Nature Center that was owned and operated by the City of Chula Vista. In 2010 the organization transitioned over to an independent 501(c)(3) non-profit and a new name.

Mission
The Living Coast Discovery Center inspires the care and exploration of the living Earth by connecting people with coastal animals, plants and habitats.

The mission of the Living Coast Discovery Center is to:
 "Partner in collaborative research and restoration of coastal wetlands and bays.
 Provide student-focused education through STEAM: Science, Technology, Engineering, Art, and Mathematics.
 Increase knowledge of coastal environments, climate change adaptation, and human coexistence with the natural resources of San Diego Bay."

References

External links
 

Nature centers in California
Museums in San Diego County, California
Natural history of San Diego County, California
San Diego Bay
Buildings and structures in Chula Vista, California
1987 establishments in California
Museums established in 1987